"Holidae In" is a song by American rapper Chingy featuring Ludacris and Snoop Dogg. It was released on August 25, 2003, by Capitol Records and Ludacris's Disturbing tha Peace record label as the second single off his debut album Jackpot (2003). Produced by the duo the Trak Starz, the release garnered positive reviews from critics who praised the performances. In 2020, Entertainment Weekly wrote that the legacy of the song was that increased the "coolness factor" of Holiday Inn, hotel chain based in Atlanta, and owned by the hospitality company, Intercontinental Hotels Group.

Critical reception
Nathan Rabin of The A.V. Club was positive towards the song, finding Chingy being able to hold his own opposite Ludacris and Snoop Dogg saying "it seems less like two icons helping out a scrappy newcomer than like a collaboration among three bona fide superstars." Billboard contributor Rashaun Hall praised the appearances of all three rappers throughout the track, giving note of both Chingy's "nasal flow" and Ludacris' "booming voice" mixing well and Snoop's "laid-back" delivery of the hook, raising it above your "typical party track". Matt Cibula of PopMatters panned the song, finding the scenario tiring and its guest stars contributed nothing to it, saying, "Big stars phoning it in is always a turn-off, and the fact that they bury this song at track #12 is telling. No one likes this stuff."

Commercial performance
The single debuted at number 73 on US Billboard Hot 100 chart the week of September 20, 2003. By October 4, the single had entered the top 40. In November, the St. Louis rapper was added to a nationwide promotional tour with the Atlanta based rappers, Ludacris, Lil Jon & The Eastside Boyz, Ying Yang Twins and singer, Mýa. The tour included a number of music festivals arranged by local radio stations. The went on to reach the top 10 across nine Billboard charts and remained on all nine charts for 21 weeks or more.

Music video
Directed by independent film and music video director Jeremy Rall, the video take inspiration from the music video for the song Temptations featured on Tupac Shakur's third studio album, Me Against The World(1995) and it's song title an features a hotel setting. Shot from viewer's perspective, the camera is guided through a high end mansion/hotel called the Jackpot Inn. Every room has a special feature including a sleeproom, a pillow fight room (Room 102), Jamaican smoke room (Room 103), and a neon glowing room (fitness room). There is also a Brady Bunch parody segment and T-shirts that parody the logos of Holiday Inn and Atlanta based company, The Home Depot (but reads as "The Ho Depot"). Filmed years after his death, an actor bearing a resemblance to Tupac is also in the video. 

The video was nominated for an 2004 MTV Video Music Award for Best Hip-Hop Video but lost to OutKast's "Hey Ya!".

Track listings

US and Australian CD single
 "Holidae In" (clean version) (featuring Ludacris and Snoop Dogg) – 4:32
 "Represent" (clean version) (featuring Tity Boi and I-20) – 4:12
 "Holidae In" (instrumental) (featuring Ludacris and Snoop Dogg) – 4:32

US 12-inch single
 "Holidae In" (clean version) (featuring Ludacris and Snoop Dogg) – 4:30
 "Holidae In" (album version) (featuring Ludacris and Snoop Dogg) – 5:13
 "Holidae In" (instrumental) (featuring Ludacris and Snoop Dogg) – 5:13
 "Represent" (clean version) (featuring Tity Boi and I-20) – 4:12
 "Represent" (album version) (featuring Tity Boi and I-20) – 4:12
 "Represent" (instrumental) (featuring Tity Boi and I-20) – 4:12

UK CD1
 "Holidae In" (radio clean version) (featuring Ludacris and Snoop Dogg)
 "Holidae In" (video) (featuring Ludacris and Snoop Dogg)
 "Represent" (clean) (featuring Tity Boi and I-20)
 "Right Thurr" (video)

UK CD2
 "Holidae In" (radio clean version) (featuring Ludacris and Snoop Dogg)
 "Represent" (clean) (featuring Tity Boi and I-20)

UK 12-inch single
A1. "Holidae In" (explicit version) (featuring Ludacris and Snoop Dogg) – 5:14
A2. "Holidae In" (instrumental) (featuring Ludacris and Snoop Dogg) – 5:15
B1. "Represent" (clean version) (featuring Tity Boi and I-20) – 4:12

Charts

Weekly charts

Year-end charts

Certifications

Release history

References

2003 songs
2004 singles
Capitol Records singles
Chingy songs
Ludacris songs
Music videos directed by Jeremy Rall
Snoop Dogg songs
Songs about hotels and motels
Songs written by Chingy
Songs written by Ludacris